Foreign Gods, Inc. is a 2014 novel written by Nigerian author Okey Ndibe.

Plot
Foreign Gods, Inc. is about Ike, a Nigerian who faced some difficulty after traveling to New York and working as a taxi driver. He comes back to steal the statue of an ancient war deity from his home village and sell it to a New York business man for money.

References

2014 Nigerian novels
Soho Press books
Novels by Okey Ndibe
Novels set in New York City